Aryankavu  railway station (Code: AYV) is a railway station in Kollam, Kerala and falls under the Madurai railway division of the Southern Railway zone, Indian Railways.

References

Railway stations in Kollam district
Madurai railway division
Railway stations opened in 1904